The Houthi movement (al-Ḥūthīyūn ), officially called Ansar Allah (  Partisans of God or Supporters of God) and colloquially simply Houthis, is an Islamist political and armed movement that emerged from Saada Governorate in North Yemen in the 1990s. The Houthi movement is a predominately Zaidi Shia force, whose leadership is drawn largely from the Houthi tribe.

The Houthis have a complex relationship with Yemen's Sunni Muslims; the movement has discriminated against Sunnis, but also recruited and allied with them. Under the leadership of Hussein Badreddin al-Houthi, the group emerged as an opposition to former Yemeni president Ali Abdullah Saleh. They accused him of corruption and criticized him for being backed by Saudi Arabia and the United States. Hussein accused Saleh of seeking to please the U.S. at the expense of the Yemeni people and Yemen's sovereignty. Resisting Saleh's order for his arrest, Hussein was killed in Sa'dah in 2004 along with a number of his guards by the Yemeni army, sparking the Houthi insurgency in Yemen. Since then, except for a short intervening period, the movement has been led by his brother Abdul-Malik al-Houthi.

The Houthi movement attracts its Zaidi-Shia followers in Yemen by promoting regional political-religious issues in its media, including the overarching U.S.–Israeli conspiracy theory and Arab "collusion". In 2003, the Houthis' slogan, "God is great, death to the US, death to Israel, curse the Jews, and victory for Islam", became the group's trademark.

The movement's expressed goals include combating economic underdevelopment and political marginalization in Yemen while seeking greater autonomy for Houthi-majority regions of the country. They also claim to support a more democratic non-sectarian republic in Yemen. The Houthis have made fighting corruption the centerpiece of their political program.

The Houthis took part in the 2011 Yemeni Revolution by participating in street protests and by coordinating with other opposition groups. They joined the National Dialogue Conference in Yemen as part of the Gulf Cooperation Council (GCC) initiative to broker peace following the unrest. However, the Houthis would later reject the November 2011 GCC deal's provisions stipulating formation of six federal regions in Yemen, claiming that the deal did not fundamentally reform governance and that the proposed federalization "divided Yemen into poor and wealthy regions". Houthis also feared the deal was a blatant attempt to weaken them by dividing areas under their control between separate regions. In late 2014, Houthis repaired their relationship with the former president Ali Abdullah Saleh, and with his help, they took control of the capital and much of the north.

In 2014–2015, Houthis took over the government in Sanaa with the help of the former president Ali Abdullah Saleh, and announced the fall of the current government of Abdrabbuh Mansur Hadi. Houthis have gained control of most of the northern part of Yemen's territory and since 2015 have been resisting the Saudi-led military intervention in Yemen that claims to seek to restore the internationally recognized Yemeni government to power. Additionally, the Islamic State militant group has attacked all of the conflict's major parties including Houthis, Saleh forces, the Yemeni government, and the Saudi Arabian–led coalition forces. The Houthis have launched repeated missile and drone attacks against Saudi cities. The conflict is widely seen as a proxy war between Saudi Arabia and Iran.

History

According to Ahmed Addaghashi, a professor at Sanaa University, the Houthis began as a moderate theological movement that preached tolerance and held a broad-minded view of all the Yemeni peoples. Their first organization, "the Believing Youth" (BY), was founded in 1992 in Saada Governorate by either Mohammed al-Houthi, or his brother Hussein al-Houthi.

The Believing Youth established school clubs and summer camps in order to "promote a Zaidi revival" in Saada. By 1994–1995, 15–20,000 students had attended BY summer camps. The religious material included lectures by Mohammed Hussein Fadhlallah (a Lebanese shia scholar) and Hassan Nasrallah (Secretary General of Lebanon's Hezbollah Party)."

The formation of the Houthi organisations has been described by Adam Baron of the European Council on Foreign Relations as a reaction to foreign intervention. Their views include shoring up Zaidi support against the perceived threat of Saudi-influenced ideologies in Yemen and a general condemnation of the former Yemeni government's alliance with the United States, which, along with complaints regarding the government's corruption and the marginalisation of much of the Houthis' home areas in Saada, constituted the group's key grievances.

Although Hussein al-Houthi, who was killed in 2004, had no official relation with Believing Youth, according to Zaid, he contributed to the radicalisation of some Zaydis after the 2003 invasion of Iraq. BY-affiliated youth adopted anti-American and anti-Jewish slogans which they chanted in the Saleh Mosque in Sanaa after Friday prayers.
According to Zaid, the followers of Houthi's insistence on chanting the slogans attracted the authorities' attention, further increasing government worries over the extent of the al-Houthi movement's influence. "The security authorities thought that if today the Houthis chanted `Death to America', tomorrow they could be chanting 'Death to the president [of Yemen]".
800 BY supporters were arrested in Sanaa in 2004. President Ali Abdullah Saleh then invited Hussein al-Houthi to a meeting in Sanaa, but Hussein declined. On 18 June 2004 Saleh sent government forces to arrest Hussein.

Hussein responded by launching an insurgency against the central government, but was killed on 10 September 2004. The insurgency continued intermittently until a ceasefire agreement was reached in 2010. During this prolonged conflict, the Yemeni army, and air force was used to suppress the Houthi rebellion in northern Yemen. The Saudis joined these anti-Houthi campaigns, but the Houthis won against both Saleh and the Saudi army. According to the Brookings Institution, this particularly humiliated the Saudis, who spent tens of billions of dollars on their military.

Later, the Houthis participated in the 2011 Yemeni Revolution, as well as the ensuing National Dialogue Conference (NDC). However, they rejected the provisions of the November 2011 Gulf Cooperation Council deal on the ground that "it divide[d] Yemen into poor and wealthy regions" and also in response to assassination of their representative at NDC.

As the revolution went on, Houthis gained control of greater territory. By 9 November 2011, Houthis were said to be in control of two Yemeni governorates (Saada and Al Jawf) and close to taking over a third governorate (Hajjah), which would enable them to launch a direct assault on the Yemeni capital of Sanaa. In May 2012, it was reported that the Houthis controlled a majority of Saada, Al Jawf, and Hajjah governorates; they had also gained access to the Red Sea and started erecting barricades north of Sanaa in preparation for more conflict.

By 21 September 2014, Houthis were said to control parts of the Yemeni capital, Sanaa, including government buildings and a radio station. While Houthi control expanded to the rest of Sanaa, as well as other towns such as Rada', this control was strongly challenged by Al-Qaeda. The Gulf States believed that the Houthis had accepted aid from Iran while Saudi Arabia was aiding their Yemeni rivals.

On 20 January 2015, Houthi rebels seized the presidential palace in the capital. President Abdrabbuh Mansur Hadi was in the presidential palace during the takeover, but was not harmed. The movement officially took control of the Yemeni government on 6 February, dissolving parliament and declaring its Revolutionary Committee to be the acting authority in Yemen. On 20 March 2015, The al-Badr and al-Hashoosh mosques came under suicide attack during midday prayers, and the Islamic State of Iraq and the Levant quickly claimed responsibility. The blasts killed 142 Houthi worshippers and wounded more than 351, making it the deadliest terrorist attack in Yemen's history.

On 27 March 2015, in response to perceived Houthi threats to Sunni factions in the region, Saudi Arabia along with Bahrain, Qatar, Kuwait, UAE, Egypt, Jordan, Morocco, and Sudan led a gulf coalition airstrike in Yemen. The military coalition included the United States which helped in planning of airstrikes, as well as logistical and intelligence support.

According to a 2015 September report by Esquire magazine, the Houthis, once the outliers, are now one of the most stable and organised social and political movements in Yemen. The power vacuum created by Yemen's uncertain transitional period has drawn more supporters to the Houthis. Many of the formerly powerful parties, now disorganised with an unclear vision, have fallen out of favour with the public, making the Houthis—under their newly branded Ansar Allah name—all the more attractive.

Houthi spokesperson Mohamed Abdel Salam stated that his group had spotted messages between the UAE and Saleh three months before his death. He told Al-Jazeera that there was communication between Saleh, UAE and a number of other countries such as Russia and Jordan through encrypted messages. The alliance between Saleh and the Houthi broke down in late 2017, with armed clashes occurring in Sanaa from 28 November.
Saleh declared the split in a televised statement on 2 December, calling on his supporters to take back the country and expressed openness to a dialogue with the Saudi-led coalition. On 4 December 2017, Saleh's house in Sanaa was assaulted by fighters of the Houthi movement, according to residents. Saleh was killed by the Houthis on the same day.

In January 2021, the United States designated the Houthis a terrorist organization, creating fears of an aid shortage in Yemen, but this stance was reversed a month later after Joe Biden became president.

On 17 January 2022, Houthi missile and drone attacks on UAE industrial targets set fuel trucks on fire and killed three foreign workers. This was the first specific attack to which the Houthi admitted, and the first to result in deaths. A response led by Saudi Arabia included a 21 January air strike on a detention centre in Yemen, resulting in at least 70 deaths.

Membership and support

There is a difference between the al-Houthi family and the Houthi movement. The movement was called by their opponents and foreign media "Houthis". The name came from the surname of the early leader of the movement, Hussein al-Houthi, who died in 2004.

The Houthis avoid assuming a singular tribal identity. Instead, the group strategically draws support from tribes of the northern Bakil federation, rival to the Hashid federation which had been a traditional ally of the central government. The Houthis' lack of centralised command structure allows them to generate immense support, as Yemenis from diverse backgrounds have joined their cause.

Membership of the group had between 1,000 and 3,000 fighters as of 2005 and between 2,000 and 10,000 fighters as of 2009. In 2010, the Yemen Post claimed that they had over 100,000 fighters. According to Houthi expert Ahmed Al-Bahri, by 2010, the Houthis had a total of 100,000–120,000 followers, including both armed fighters and unarmed loyalists.

As of 2015, the group is reported to have attracted new supporters from outside their traditional demographics.

Ideology

The Houthi movement follows a mixed ideology with religious, Yemeni nationalist, and big tent populist tenets, imitating Hezbollah. Outsiders have argued that their political views are often vague, contradictory, and many of their slogans do not accurately reflect their aims. According to researcher Bernard Haykel, the movement's founder Hussein al-Houthi was influenced by a variety of different religious traditions and political ideologies, making it difficult to fit him or his followers into existing categories. The Houthis have portrayed themselves as national resistance, defending all Yemenis from outside aggression and influences, as champions against corruption, chaos, and extremism, and as representative for the interests of marginalized tribal groups and the Zayidi sect.

Haykel argued that the Houthi movement has two central religious-ideological tenets. The second is the belief in the absolute, divine right of Ahl al-Bayt (Prophet's descendants) to rule, a belief attributed to Jaroudism, a fundamentalist offshoot of Zaydism.

The group has also exploited the popular discontent over corruption and reduction of government subsidies. According to a February 2015 Newsweek report, Houthis are fighting "for things that all Yemenis crave: government accountability, the end to corruption, regular utilities, fair fuel prices, job opportunities for ordinary Yemenis and the end of Western influence". In forging alliances, the Houthi movement has been opportunistic, at times allying with countries it later declared its enemy such as the United States.

Religion 
In general, the Houthi movement has centered its belief system on the Zaydi branch of Islam, a sect of Islam almost exclusively present in Yemen. Zaydis make up about 25 percent of the population, Sunnis make up 75 percent. Zaydi-led governments ruled Yemen for 1,000 years up until 1962. Since its foundation, the Houthi movement has often acted as advocates for Zaydi revivalism in Yemen.

Although they have framed their struggle in religious terms and put great importance in their Zaydi roots, the Houthis are not an exclusively Zaydi group. In fact, they have outright rejected their portrayal by others as a faction which is purportedly only interested in Zaydi-related issues. They have not publicly advocated for the restoration of the old Zaydi imamate, although analysts have argued that they might plan to restore it in the future. Most Yemenis have a low opinion of the old imamate, and Hussein al-Houthi also did not advocate the imamate's restoration. Instead, he proposed a "Guiding Eminence" (alam al-huda), an individual descended from the Prophet who would act as a "universal leader for the world", though never defined this position's prerogatives or how they should be appointed.

The movement has also recruited and allied with Sunni Muslims; according to researcher Ahmed Nagi, several themes of the Houthi ideology "such as Muslim unity, prophetic lineages, and opposition to corruption [...] allowed the Houthis to mobilize not only northern Zaydis, but also inhabitants of predominantly Shafi'i areas." However, the group is known to have discriminated against Sunni Muslims as well, closing Sunni mosques and primarily placing Zaydis in leadership positions in Houthi-controlled areas. The Houthis lost significant support among Sunni tribes after killing ex-President Saleh.

Many Zaydis also oppose the Houthis, regarding them as Iranian proxies and the Houthis' form of Zaydi revivalism an attempt to "establish Shiite rule in the north of Yemen". In addition, Haykel argued that the Houthis follow a "a highly politicised, revolutionary, and intentionally simplistic, even primitivist interpretation of [Zaydism]'s teachings". Their view of Islam is largely based on the teachings of Hussein al-Houthi, collected after his death in a book titled Malazim (Fascicles), a work treated by Houthis as more important than older Zaydi theological traditions, resulting in repeated disputes with established Zaydi religious leaders. The Malazim reflect a number of different religious and ideological influences, including by Khomeinism and revolutionary Sunni Islamist movements such as the Muslim Brotherhood. Hussein al-Houthi believed that the "last exemplary" Zaydi scholar and leader was Al-Hadi ila'l-Haqq Yahya; later Zaydi imams were regarded as having deviated from the original form of Islam. The Houthis' belief in the "Quranic Way" also includes the rejection of tafsir (Quranic interpretations) as being derivative and divisive, meaning that they have a low opinion of most existing Islamic theological and juridical schools, including Zaydi traditionalists based in Sanaa with whom they often clash.

The Houthis have asserted that their actions are to fight against the alleged expansion of Salafism in Yemen, and for the defence of their community from discrimination. In the years before the rise of the Houthi movement, state-supported Salafis had harassed Zaydis and destroyed Zaydi sites in Yemen. After their rise to power in 2014, the Houthis consequently "crushed" the Salafi community in Saada Governorate and mostly eliminated the al-Qaeda presence in the areas under their control; the Houthis view al-Qaeda as "Salafi jihadists" and thus "mortal enemies". On the other side, between 2014 and 2019, the Houthi leadership have signed multiple co-existence agreements with the Salafi community; pursuing Shia-Salafi reconciliation.

Forms of government 
In general, the Houthis' political ideology has gradually shifted from "heavily-religious mobilisation and activism under Husayn to the more assertive and statesmanlike rhetoric under Abdulmalik", its current leader. Due to strong support received by Houthis from the predominantly Zaydi northern tribes, the Houthi movement has often been described as tribalist or monarchist faction in opposition to republicanism. Regardless, they have managed to rally many people outside of their traditional bases to their cause, and became a major nationalist force.

When armed conflict for the first time erupted back in 2004 between the Yemeni government and Houthis, the President Ali Abdullah Saleh accused the Houthis and other Islamic opposition parties of trying to overthrow the government and the republican system. However, Houthi leaders, for their part, rejected the accusation by saying that they had never rejected the president or the republican system, but were only defending themselves against government attacks on their community. After their takeover of northern Yemen in 2014, the Houthis remained committed to republicanism and continued to celebrate republican holidays. The Houthis have an ambivalent stance on the possible transformation of Yemen into a federation or the separation into two fully independent countries to solve the country's crisis. Though not opposed to these plans per se, they have declined any plans which would in their eyes marginalize the northern tribes politically.

Meanwhile, their opponents have asserted that the Houthis desire to institute Zaydi religious law, destabilising the government and stirring anti-American sentiment. In contrast, Hassan al-Homran, a former Houthi spokesperson, has said that "Ansar Allah supports the establishment of a civil state in Yemen. We want to build a striving modern democracy. Our goals are to fulfil our people's democratic aspirations in keeping with the Arab Spring movement." In an interview with Yemen Times, Hussein al-Bukhari, a Houthi insider, said that Houthis' preferable political system is a republic with elections where women can also hold political positions, and that they do not seek to form a cleric-led government after the model of Islamic Republic of Iran, for "we cannot apply this system in Yemen because the followers of the Shafi (Sunni) doctrine are bigger in number than the Zaydis". In 2018, the Houthi leadership proposed the establishment of a non-partisan transitional government composed of technocrats.

Ali Akbar Velayati, International Affairs Advisor to Iranian Supreme Leader Ayatollah Ali Khamenei, stated in October 2014 that "We are hopeful that Ansar-Allah has the same role in Yemen as Hezbollah has in eradicating the terrorists in Lebanon". Mohammed Ali al-Houthi criticized the Trump-brokered Abraham Accords between Israel and the United Arab Emirates as "betrayal" against the Palestinians and the cause of pan-Arabism.

Women's rights and freedom of expression 
The Houthis' treatment of women and their restrictions on the arts has also been subject of debate. On one side, the movement has stated that it defends women's rights to vote and take public offices, and some feminists have fled from government-held areas into Houthi territories as the latter at least disempower more radical Jihadists. The Houthis field their own women security force, and have a Girl Scouts wing. However, it has been also been reported that Houthis harass women and restrict their freedoms of movement and expression.

In regards to culture, the Houthis try to spread their views through propaganda using mainstream media, social media, and poetry as well as the "Houthification" of the education system to "instil Huthi values and mobilise the youth to join the fight against the coalition forces". However, the Houthis have been inconsistent in regards how to deal with forms of artistic expression which they disapprove of. The movement has allowed radio stations to continue broadcast music and content which the Houthis view as too Western, but also banned certain songs and harassed artists such as wedding musicians. In one instance which generated much publicity, the Houthi policemen conditioned that music could be played at a wedding party if it was not broadcast by loadspeakers; when the party guests did not conform to this demand, the main wedding singer was arrested. Journalist Robert F. Worth stated that "many secular-minded Yemenis seem unsure whether to view the Houthis as oppressors or potential allies." In general, the Houthis' policies are often decided on a local basis, and high-ranking Houthi officials are often incapable of checking regional officers' powers, making the treatment of civilians dependent on the area.

Slogan

The group's slogan reads as following: "God Is Great, Death to America, Death to Israel, Curse on the Jews, Victory to Islam". This motto is partially modelled on the motto of revolutionary Iran, which reads "Death to U.S., and death to Israel".

Some Houthi supporters stress that their ire for the U.S. and Israel is directed toward the governments of America and Israel. Ali al-Bukhayti, the spokesperson and official media face of the Houthis, rejected the literal interpretation of the slogan by stating in one of his interviews that "We do not really want death to anyone. The slogan is simply against the interference of those governments [i. e., U.S. and Israel]". In the Arabic Houthi-affiliated TV and radio stations they use religious connotations associated with jihad against Israel and the US.

Relationship with the Yemeni Jews 
The Houthis have been accused of expelling or restricting members of the rural Yemeni Jewish community, which had about 50 remaining members. Reports of abuse include Houthi supporters bullying or attacking the country's Jews. Houthi officials, however, have denied any involvement in the harassment, asserting that under Houthi control, Jews in Yemen would be able to live and operate freely as any other Yemeni citizen. "Our problems are with Zionism and the occupation of Palestine, but Jews here have nothing to fear", said Fadl Abu Taleb, a spokesman for the Houthis. But despite insistence by Houthi leaders that the movement is not sectarian, a Yemeni Jewish rabbi has reportedly said that many Jews remain terrified by the movement's slogan. As a result, Yemeni Jews reportedly retain a negative sentiment towards the Houthis, who they allege have committed persecutions against them. According to Israeli Druze politician Ayoob Kara, Houthi militants had given an ultimatum telling Jews to "convert to Islam or leave Yemen".

In March 2016, a UAE-based newspaper reported that one of the Yemeni Jews, who emigrated to Israel in 2016, was fighting with the Houthis. In the same month a Kuwaiti newspaper, al-Watan, reported that a Yemeni Jew named Haroun al-Bouhi was killed in Najran while fighting with the Houthis against Saudi Arabia. The Kuwaiti newspaper added that the Yemeni Jews had a good relationship with Ali Abdullah Salah, who was at that time allied with the Houthis and were fighting in different fronts with the Houthis.

Al-Houthi has said through his fascicles: “Arab countries and all Islamic countries will not be safe from Jews except through their eradication and the elimination of their entity.” A New York Times journalist reported being asked why they were speaking to a "dirty Jew" and that the Jews in the village were unable to communicate with their neighbors.

Allegations of harassment against Baháʼí minority 
The Houthis have been accused of detaining, torturing, arresting, and holding incommunicado Baháʼí Faith members on charges of espionage and apostasy, which are punishable by death. Houthi leader Abdel-Malek al-Houthi has targeted Baháʼís in public speeches, and accused the followers of Baháʼí Faith of being "satanic" and agents for the western countries, citing a 2013 fatwa issued by Iran's supreme leader.

Leaders
 Hussein Badreddin al-Houthi – former leader (killed 2004)
 Abdul-Malik Badreddin al-Houthi – leader
 Yahia Badreddin al-Houthi – senior leader
 Abdul-Karim Badreddin al-Houthi – high-ranking commander
Badr Eddin al-Houthi – spiritual leader (died 2010)
 Abdullah al-Ruzami – former military commander
 Abu Ali Abdullah al-Hakem al-Houthi – military commander
 Saleh Habra – political leader
 Fares Mana'a – Houthi-appointed governor of Sa'dah, and former head of Saleh's presidential committee

Activism and tactics

Political
During their campaigns against both the Saleh and Hadi governments, Houthis used civil disobedience. Following the Yemeni government's decision on 13 July 2014 to increase fuel prices, Houthi leaders succeeded in organising massive rallies in the capital Sanaa to protest the decision and to demand resignation of the incumbent government of Abd Rabbuh Mansur Hadi for "state-corruption". These protests developed into the 2014–2015 phase of the insurgency. Similarly, following 2015 Saudi-led airstrikes against Houthis which claimed civilians lives, Yemenis responded to the Abdul-Malik al-Houthi's call and took to streets of the capital, Sanaa, in tens of thousands to voice their anger at the Saudi invasion.

Cultural

The Houthis have also held a number of mass gatherings since the revolution. On 24 January 2013, thousands gathered in Dahiyan, Sa'dah and Heziez, just outside Sanaa, to celebrate Mawlid al-Nabi, the birth of Mohammed. A similar event took place on 13 January 2014 at the main sports' stadium in Sanaa. On this occasion, men and women were completely segregated: men filled the open-air stadium and football field in the centre, guided by appointed Houthi safety officials wearing bright vests and matching hats; women poured into the adjacent indoor stadium, led inside by security women distinguishable only by their purple sashes and matching hats. The indoor stadium held at least five thousand women—ten times as many attendees as the 2013 gathering.

Media 
The Houthis are said to have "a huge and well-oiled propaganda machine". They have established "a formidable media arm" with the Lebanese Hezbollah's technical support. The format and content of the group's leader, Abdul-Malik al-Houthi's televised speeches are said to have been modeled after those of Hezbollah's Secretary General, Hassan Nasrallah. Following the peaceful youth uprising in 2011, the group launched its official TV channel, Almasirah. "The most impressive part" of Houthi propaganda, though, is their media print which includes 25 print and electronic publications.

Houthis also utilize radios as an effective means of spreading influence, storming radio stations and confiscating equipment of radio stations that do not adhere to what they're allowed to broadcast by the Houthis. A Houthi fundraising campaign through a radio station affiliated with Iran-backed Houthi rebels has collected 73.5 million Yemeni rials ($132,000) for the Lebanese militant group Hezbollah.

Another western-based media, "Uprising Today", is also known to be extensively pro-Houthi.

Combat and military
In 2009, US Embassy sources have reported that Houthis used increasingly more sophisticated tactics and strategies in their conflict with the government as they gained more experience, and that they fought with religious fervor.

Armed strength

Late in 2015, Houthis announced the local production of short-range ballistic missile Qaher-1 on Al-Masirah TV. On 19 May 2017 Saudi Arabia intercepted a Houthi-fired ballistic missile targeting a deserted area south of the Saudi capital and most populous city Riyadh. The Houthi militias have captured dozens of tanks and masses of heavy weaponry from the Yemeni Armed Forces.

In June 2019, the Saudi-led coalition stated that the Houthis had launched 226 ballistic missiles during the insurgency so far.

The 2019 Abqaiq–Khurais attack targeted the Saudi Aramco oil processing facilities at Abqaiq and Khurais in eastern Saudi Arabia on 14 September 2019. The Houthi movement claimed responsibility, though the United States has asserted that Iran was behind the attack. Iranian President Hassan Rouhani said that "Yemeni people are exercising their legitimate right of defence ... the attacks were a reciprocal response to aggression against Yemen for years."

Naval warfare capabilities 
In course of the Yemeni Civil War, the Houthis developed tactics to combat their opponents' navies. At first, their anti-ship operations were unsophisticated and limited to rocket-propelled grenades being shot at vessels close to the shore. In the fight to secure the port city of Aden in 2015, the Yemeni Navy was largely destroyed, including all missile-carrying vessels. A number of smaller patrol craft, landing craft, and Mi-14 and Ka-28 ASW helicopters did survive. Their existence under Houthi control would be brief, as the majority of them were destroyed in air attacks during the Saudi-led intervention in Yemen in 2015. As a result, the Houthis were left with AShMs stored ashore (but no launchers) and a smattering of small patrol ships. These, along with a number of locally manufactured small craft and miscellaneous vessels, were to form the foundation of the new naval warfare capabilities.

Already soon after the Houthis took over Yemen in 2015, Iran sought to strengthen the Houthis' naval capabilities, allowing the Houthis (and thus Iran) to intercept Coalition shipping off the Red Sea coast, by providing additional AShMs and constructing truck-based launchers that could easily be hidden after a launch. Iran also anchored the Saviz intelligence vessel (disguised as a regular cargo vessel) off the coast of Eritrea, from which it provided intelligence and updates on Coalition ship movements to the Houthis. The Saviz served in this capacity until it was damaged in an Israeli limpet mine attack in April 2021, when it was replaced by the Behshad. The Behshad, like the Saviz, is based on a cargo ship.

Meanwhile, in Yemen, the Houthis (presumably with the assistance of Iranian engineers) converted a number of 10-meter-long patrol craft donated by the UAE to the Yemeni Coast Guard in the early 2010s into WBIEDs. In 2017, one of these was used to attack the Saudi frigate Al Madinah. In the years since, three more WBIED designs have been built: the Tawfan-1, Tawfan-2, and Tawfan-3. 15 different types of naval mines were also produced. These are being increasingly deployed in the Red Sea, but have yet to be successful (against naval vessels). The delivery of 120km-ranged Noor and 200km-ranged Qader AShMs, 300km-ranged Khalij Fars ASBMs, and Fajr-4CL and "Al-Bahr Al-Ahmar" anti-ship rockets by Iran, which were unveiled during a 2022 Houthi parade, was arguably the most significant escalation in support. They combine long range, low cost, and high mobility with various types of guidance to create a weapon well-suited to the Houthi Navy.

Though the Houthis' ASBM arsenal has yet to be tested, the Houthi Navy has had notable success with AShMs. On October 1, 2016, it was able to hit the UAE Navy's HSV-2 Swift hybrid catamaran with a single C-801/C-802 AShM fired from a shore battery. Although the ship managed to stay afloat, the damage was so severe that it had to be decommissioned. The US Navy then sent two destroyers and an amphibious transport dock to the area to ensure that shipping could continue unabated. These vessels were then attacked with AShMs on three separate occasions, with no success.

Though these attacks demonstrated the Houthis' limited ability to threaten vessels in Yemen's surrounding seas, the threat posed by them has since evolved significantly. Armed with a variety of anti-ship ballistic missiles and rockets that can be notoriously difficult to intercept and cover large areas, the next round of maritime clashes with the navies of the United Arab Emirates, Saudi Arabia, and the United States could have a completely different outcome. The Houthis have also hinted at using their extensive arsenal of loitering munitions against commercial shipping in the Red Sea, a tactic similar to recent Iranian tactics in the Persian Gulf.

Patrol boats were fitted with anti-tank guided missiles, about 30 coast-watcher stations were set up, disguised "spy dhows" were constructed, and the maritime radar of docked ships used to create targeting solutions for attacks. One of the most notable features of the Houthis' naval arsenal became its remote-controlled drone boats which carry explosives and ram enemy warships. Among these, the self-guiding Shark-33 explosive drone boats originated as patrol boats of the old Yemeni coast guard. In addition, the Houthis have begun to train combat divers on the Zuqar and Bawardi islands.

Allegations of Iranian and North Korean support 
Former Yemeni president Ali Abdullah Saleh had accused the Houthis of having ties to external backers, in particular the Iranian government. Saleh stated in a New York Times' interview that "The real reason they received unofficial support from Iran was because they repeat same slogan that is raised by Iran -- death to America, death to Israel". He also said "The Iranian media repeats statements of support for these Houthi elements. They are all trying to take revenge against the USA on Yemeni territories". Tehran has denied allegations of Houthis receiving arms support from Iran.

The Houthis in turn accused the Saleh government of being backed by Saudi Arabia and of using Al-Qaeda to repress them. Under the next President Hadi, Gulf Arab states accused Iran of backing the Houthis financially and militarily, though Iran denied this, and they were themselves backers of President Hadi. Despite confirming statements by Iranian and Yemeni officials in regards to Iranian support in the form of trainers, weaponry, and money, the Houthis denied reception of substantial financial or arm support from Iran. Joost Hiltermann of Foreign Policy wrote that whatever little material support the Houthis may have received from Iran, the intelligence and military support by US and UK for the Saudi Arabian-led coalition exceed that by many factors.

In April 2015, the United States National Security Council spokesperson Bernadette Meehan remarked that "It remains our assessment that Iran does not exert command and control over the Houthis in Yemen". Joost Hiltermann wrote that Iran does not control the Houthis' decision-making as evidenced by Houthis' flat rejection of Iran's demand not to take over Sanaa in 2015. Thomas Juneau, writing in the journal, International Affairs, states that even though Iran's support for Houthis has increased since 2014, it remains far too limited to have a significant impact in the balance of power in Yemen. The Quincy Institute for Responsible Statecraft argues that Teheran's influence over the movement has been "greatly exaggerated" by "the Saudis, their coalition partners (mainly the United Arab Emirates), and their [lobbyists] in Washington."

A December 2009 cable between Sanaa and various intelligence agencies disseminated by WikiLeaks states that US State Dept. analysts believed the Houthis obtained weapons from the Yemeni black market and corrupt members of the Yemenis Republican Guard.
On the edition of 8 April 2015 of PBS Newshour, Secretary of State John Kerry stated that the US knew Iran was providing military support to the Houthi rebels in Yemen, adding that Washington "is not going to stand by while the region is destabilised".

Phillip Smyth of the Washington Institute for Near East Policy told Business Insider that Iran views Shia groups in the Middle East as "integral elements to the Islamic Revolutionary Guard Corps (IRGC)". Smyth claimed that there is a strong bond between Iran and the Houthi uprising working to overthrow the government in Yemen. According to Smyth, in many cases Houthi leaders go to Iran for ideological and religious education, and Iranian and Hezbollah leaders have been spotted on the ground advising the Houthi troops, and these Iranian advisers are likely responsible for training the Houthis to use the type of sophisticated guided missiles fired at the US Navy.

For Iran, supporting the revolt in Yemen is "a good way to bleed the Saudis", Iran's regional and ideological rival. Essentially, Iran is backing the Houthis to fight against a Saudi-led coalition of Gulf States fighting to maintain government control of Yemen. The discord has led some publishers to fear that further confrontations may lead to an all-out Sunni-Shia war.

In 2013, photographs released by the Yemeni government show the United States Navy and Yemen's security forces seized a class of shoulder-fired anti-aircraft missiles not publicly known to have been out of state control.

In April 2016, the U.S. Navy intercepted a large Iranian arms shipment, seizing thousands of weapons, AK-47 rifles and rocket-propelled grenade launchers. The Pentagon stated that the shipment was likely headed to Yemen.

In August 2018, the United Nations had found out the North Korean government had armed the Houthis via Syria after a meeting between a Houthi member and a North Korean government official.

The Houthis have repeatedly used a drone that is nearly identical to Iran Aircraft Manufacturing Industrial Company's Ababil-T drone in strikes against Saudi Arabia.

IRGC involvement
In 2013, an Iranian vessel was seized and discovered to be carrying Katyusha rockets, heat-seeking surface-to-air missiles, RPG-7s, Iranian-made night vision goggles and artillery systems that track land and navy targets 40 km away. That was en route to the Houthis.

In March 2017, Qasem Soleimani, the head of Iran's Quds Force, met with Iran's Revolutionary Guard Corps to look for ways to what was described as "empowering" the Houthis. Soleimani was quoted as saying, "At this meeting, they agreed to increase the amount of help, through training, arms and financial support." Despite the Iranian government, and Houthis both officially denying Iranian support for the group. Brigadier General Ahmad Asiri, the spokesman of the Saudi-led coalition told Reuters that evidence of Iranian support was manifested in the Houthi use of Kornet anti-tank guided missiles which had never been in use with the Yemeni military or with the Houthis and that the arrival of Kornet missiles had only come at a later time. In the same month the IRGC had altered the routes used in transporting equipment to the Houthis by spreading out shipments to smaller vessels in Kuwaiti territorial waters in order to avoid naval patrols in the Gulf of Oman due to sanctions imposed, shipments reportedly included parts of missiles, launchers, and drugs.

In May 2018, the United States imposed sanctions on Iran's IRGC, which was also listed as a designated terrorist organization by the US over its role in providing support for the Houthis, including help with manufacturing ballistic missiles used in attacks targeting cities and oil fields in Saudi Arabia.

In August 2018, despite previous Iranian denial of military support for the Houthis, IRGC commander Nasser Shabani was quoted by the Iranian Fars News Agency as saying, "We (IRGC) told Yemenis [Houthi rebels] to strike two Saudi oil tankers, and they did it," on 7 August 2018. In response to Shabani's account, the IRGC released a statement saying that the quote was a "Western lie" and that Shabani was a retired commander, despite no actual reports of his retirement after 37 years in the IRGC, and media linked to the Iranian government confirming he was still enlisted with the IRGC. Furthermore, while the Houthis and the Iranian government have previously denied any military affiliation, Iranian supreme leader Ali Khamenei openly announced his "spiritual" support of the movement in a personal meeting with the Houthi spokesperson Mohammed Abdul Salam in Tehran, in the midst of ongoing conflicts in Aden in 2019.

Allegations of human rights violations 
Houthis have been accused of violations of international humanitarian law such as using child soldiers, shelling civilian areas, forced evacuations and executions. According to Human Right Watch, Houthis intensified their recruitment of children in 2015. The UNICEF mentioned that children with the Houthis and other armed groups in Yemen comprise up to a third of all fighters in Yemen. Human Rights Watch has further accused Houthi forces of using landmines in Yemen's third-largest city of Taizz which has caused many civilian casualties and prevent the return of families displaced by the fighting. HRW has also accused the Houthis of interfering with the work of Yemen's human rights advocates and organizations.
	 
An HRW researcher, quoted in 2009 US embassy report, has downplayed the allegations by the former government of Yemen accusing the Houthis of using civilians as human shields, by saying that they did not have enough evidence to conclude that the Houthis have been intentionally using civilians as human shields.

According to the Human Rights Watch, the Houthis also use hostage taking as a tactic to generate profit. Human Rights Watch documented 16 cases in which Houthi authorities held people unlawfully, in large part to extort money from relatives or to exchange them for people held by opposing forces.

The United Nations World Food Programme has accused the Houthis of diverting food aid and illegally removing food lorries from distribution areas, with rations sold on the open market or given to those not entitled to it. The WFP has also warned that aid could be suspended to areas of Yemen under the control of Houthi rebels due to "obstructive and uncooperative" Houthi leaders that have hampered the independent selection of beneficiaries. WFP spokesman Herve Verhoosel stated "The continued blocking by some within the Houthi leadership of the biometric registration ... is undermining an essential process that would allow us to independently verify that food is reaching ... people on the brink of famine". The WFP has warned that "unless progress is made on previous agreements we will have to implement a phased suspension of aid". The Norwegian Refugee Council has stated that they share the WPF frustrations and reiterate to the Houthis to allow humanitarian agencies to distribute food.

UN-funded investigators have uncovered proof that Houthis conscripted tens of teenage girls as informants, nurses, and guards; an unusual phenomenon in a society as conservative as Yemen. Twelve girls suffered sexual violence, arranged marriages, and child marriages as a result of their recruitment. It alleged the Houthis recruited children as young as seven years old with monetary incentives. The report cited hundreds of accounts and took place between summer 2019 and summer 2020.

Governance 
According to the 2009 US Embassy cable leaked by WikiLeaks, Houthis have reportedly established courts and prisons in areas they control. They impose their own laws on local residents, demand protection money, and dispense rough justice by ordering executions. AP's reporter, Ahmad al-Haj argued that the Houthis were winning hearts and minds by providing security in areas long neglected by the Yemeni government while limiting the arbitrary and abusive power of influential sheikhs. According to the Civic Democratic Foundation, Houthis help resolve conflicts between tribes and reduce the number of revenge killings in areas they control. The US ambassador believed that the reports that explain Houthi role as arbitrating local disputes were likely.

Areas under administration

The Houthis exert de facto authority over the bulk of North Yemen. As of 28 April 2020, they control all of North Yemen except for Marib Governorate. The Houthis' direct administration includes the following territories:
 Saada Governorate
 Marib Governorate
Sirwah
 'Amran Governorate
 Al Jawf Governorate
 Hajjah Governorate
 Sanaa Governorate
 Dhamar Governorate
 Al Mahwit Governorate
 Raymah Governorate
 Ibb Governorate
 Al Hudaydah Governorate
 Al Bayda Governorate
 Taiz Governorate

Notes

See also 

 List of Houthi Drones And Missiles

References

Works cited

External links
 
 
 

 
Arab militant groups
Antisemitism in Yemen
Islamic fundamentalism
Anti-Americanism
Anti-imperialism
Anti-Zionism in the Arab world
Anti-Zionism in the Middle East
Anti-Zionist organizations
Houthi insurgency in Yemen
Organizations designated as terrorist by Saudi Arabia
Organizations designated as terrorist by the United Arab Emirates
Organizations based in Asia designated as terrorist
Rebel groups in Yemen
Rebel groups that actively control territory
Islamic nationalism
Shia organizations
Shia Islamist groups
Yemeni Crisis (2011–present)
Yemeni Revolution
Zaidiyyah
Entities added to the Consolidated List by Australia
Resistance movements
Anti-ISIL factions
Jihadist groups in Yemen